The Hong Kong Correctional Services Museum is a museum in Tung Tau Wan Road, Stanley, Hong Kong. It was originally housed in the Staff Training Institute of the Hong Kong Correctional Services Department.

Description
Today it is housed in a two-storey building next to the parade ground of the Staff Training Institute.

Along with ten galleries, the museum contains a mock gallows and two mock cells as well as a mock guard tower on top of the building. One of the galleries displays equipment formerly used for floggings and assorted corporal punishments.  An annex for the presentation of correctional and rehabilitative services and for the display of handicrafts produced by prisoners has been added to the museum. Outside the annex is a  lookout point for visitors to savour the scenery of Tai Tam Bay.

The museum is under the management of the Correctional Services Department Staff Training Institute (STI).

Exhibits
There are ten galleries in the museum:

Gallery 1:      Punishment and Imprisonment 
Gallery 2:      Prisons History and Development 
Gallery 3:      Prisons History and Development (continuation)
Gallery 4:      Inside Prisons 
Gallery 5:      Staff Uniform, Insignia and Accoutrement 
Gallery 6:      Vietnamese Boat People 
Gallery 7:      Home Made Weapons and Unauthorised Articles 
Gallery 8:      Staff Events
Gallery 9:      Industries and Vocational Training Section 
Gallery 10:      Overseas Cooperation and Experience Sharing

Also on display are:

two mock cells
one mock gallows.

Opening hours
Tuesdays to Sundays: 10:00 am to 5:00 pm
The Museum is closed on Mondays and Public Holidays.
Group tours are available.

Transport to the museum
Bus No. 6, 6X or 260 from Central
Bus No. 14 from Sai Wan Ho
Bus No. 63 from North Point
Bus No. 65 from North Point (Sundays and Public Holidays only)
Bus No. 73 from Wah Fu Estate
Bus No. 314 from Siu Sai Wan (Sundays and Public Holidays only)
Bus No. 399 from South Horizons (Sundays and Public Holidays only)
Bus No. 973 from Tsim Sha Tsui (via Western Tunnel)
Public Light Bus No. 16X from Chai Wan
Public Light Bus No. 40 from Causeway Bay
Public Light Bus No. 52 from Aberdeen

Gallery

See also
 List of museums in Hong Kong

References

External links

Hong Kong Correctional Services Department
Hong Kong Correctional Services Museum

Museums in Hong Kong
Stanley, Hong Kong
Prison museums in Asia